(also known as Julie Manase, born 1 January  1975) is a Japanese actress.

Biography

Early life
Juri was inspired to be an actress at the age five by seeing her parents (Sonny Chiba and Yōko Nogiwa) on sets and stage. While she was in school, she took lessons in many types of arts, sports subjects to acquire a wide range of skills to become a versatile actress.  Throughout her secondary school years, she was a member of the English acting club. After graduation, she studied acting at Nippon University and was a member of the university Tate (Japanese sword-action) club.

Career
She began her acting career in 1994, in the same year landing a significant role by auditioning for a movie called "ButouhaJingi -Kanketsuhen-" She  then appeared in several TV series, movies and plays in Japan. In 1998, Juri was praised in her role as a guest lead in an NHK TV series about Samurai called “Terakoya Yume Shinan.”  Her career extended overseas when in 2002 she was invited to the US to teach 'Tate' (Japanese stage combat) to the leads in Quentin Tarantino's "Kill Bill." Along the way, she was offered the role of a "Crazy 88". The director asked her to be Lucy Liu's stunt double for a few takes due to her level of expertise in Tate and Japanese traditional dance. In 2007, she landed a role as a Shinobi (Ninja) in the NHK Taiga Drama Fūrin Kazan. Her performance as well as her expertise in sword-action fascinated the viewers.

Filmography

Television
 Watashi no Unmei - Series Regular -  (1994–1995)
 Inochi no Genba kara 3 - Series Regular -  (1995)
 Ai toha Kesshite Koukai shinaikoto - Series Regular -  (1996)
 Hitorigurashi - Series Regular -  (1996)
 Oryourigakkou Satsujinjiken - Supporting -  (1997)
 Hyouen – Recurring Guest -  (1997)
 Terakoya Yume Shinan / episode 18 - Guest Star -  (1998)
 OryouriGakkou Satsujinjiken 2 - Supporting -  (1998)
 Shichinin no OL Sommelier - Supporting -  (1998)
 Kamiyui Isaji - Guest Star -  (1999)
 Kyoto Meikyuu Annai - Guest -  (1999)
 Good News - Series Regular -  (1999)
 Kanojyotachi no Jidai - Series Regular -  (1999)
 Kids War - Series Regular -  (1999)
 Aoitori Syndrome - Series Regular -  (1999)
 Big Wing - Series Regular -  (2001)
 Kyoto Meikyuu Annai 3 - Series Regular -  (2001)
 Gekai Saeki Makoto no Satsujin Karute - Supporting -  (2001)
 Jigokuno Hanayome 2 - Supporting -  (2001)
 Kabegiwa Zeimukan  (2001)
 Jittenin / episode 9 - Guest -  (2001)
 Kyoto Meikyuu Annai 'Special'  (2001)
 Red - Recurring Guest -  (2001)
 Gokenin Zankuro - Guest Star -  (2002)
 Kyoto Meikyuu Annai 4 - Series Regular -  (2002)
 Karuta Queen - Series Regular -  (2003)
 Kyoto Meikyuu Annai 5 - Series Regular -  (2003)
 Daisuki! Itsutsugo 5 - Series Regular -  (2003)
 Misshitsu no Nukeana  (2003)
 ' Travel Show Tabi no Kaori, Toki no Asobi ' - France -  (2004)
 JikenTyousain, Nanjou Makoto - Guest Star -  (2004)
 Jikou  (2004)
 Tetsudou Keisatsukan, Kiyomura Kouzaburou  (2005)
 OnnaKeiji Mizuki - Series Regular -  (2005)
 Tetsudou Keisatsukan, Kiyomura Kouzaburou 2  (2006)
 Tetsudou Keisatsukan, Kiyomura Kouzaburou 3  (2006)
 Tetsudou Keisatsukan, Kiyomura Kouzaburou 4  (2007)
 Tetsudou Keisatsukan, Kiyomura Kouzaburou 5  (2007)
 Fūrin Kazan - Series Regular - (NHK / Taiga Drama)  (2007)
 OnnaKeiji Mizuki 2 - Series Regular -  (2007)
 Tetsudou Keisatsukan, Kiyomura Kouzaburou 6  (2008)
 Totto-chan! (2017), as Yōko Nogiwa

References

External links

Juri Manase Official Website (no longer updated)
プロフィール - レプロエンタテインメント 
 
 
 
 
JSJ project

1975 births
Living people
Japanese film actresses
Japanese television actresses
Actresses from Tokyo
20th-century Japanese actresses
21st-century Japanese actresses